The Connecticut Company or Connecticut Land Company (e.-1795) was a post-colonial land speculation company formed in the late eighteenth century to survey and encourage settlement in the eastern parts of the newly chartered Connecticut Western Reserve of the former "Ohio Country" and a prized-part of the Northwest Territory)—a post-American Revolutionary period region, that was part of the lands-claims settlement adjudicated by the new United States government regarding the contentious conflicting claims by various Eastern Seaboard states on lands west of the gaps of the Allegheny draining into the Allegheny, Monongahela, and Ohio Rivers. Under the arrangement, all the states gave up their land claims west of the Alleghenies to the Federal government save for parts parceled out to each claimant state. Western Pennsylvania was Pennsylvania's part, and the Connecticut Western Reserve was the part apportioned to Connecticut's claim. The specific Connecticut Western Reserve lands were the northeastern part of the greater Mississippi drainage basin lands just west of those defined as part of Pennsylvania's claims settlement (Western Pennsylvania).
 
The Western Reserve is located in Northeast Ohio with its hub being Cleveland. In 1795, the Connecticut Land Company bought three million acres (12,000 km²) of the Western Reserve.  Settlers used the guidelines of the Land Ordinance of 1785, which demanded the owners survey the land before settlement.  In 1796, the company began surveys and sales on property east of Cuyahoga.

The original proprietors, 57 of the wealthiest and most prominent men in Connecticut, included Oliver Phelps, the largest subscriber and chief manager of the project.  In 1796, one of the largest shareholders, Moses Cleaveland, planned a settlement on the banks of the Cuyahoga River with Seth Pease.  This planned settlement would become the city of Cleveland.

The Deeds for the land were executed as follows:

Company Introduction

The Connecticut Land Company was a company set up by a group of private investors in 1795 with the aim of making a profit from land sales.  Towards that end, the company bought a large portion of the eastern part of the Western Connecticut Reserves.   However, poor company management and political uncertainty led to weak land sales, slow economic development, and ultimately company failure in 1809.   Despite its short existence, the Connecticut Land Company was instrumental in the development of the region and left a lasting impact on the landscape.  One of the most important legacies of the Connecticut Land Company was the establishment of the settlement of Cleveland.

Key Company Figures

The ownership of the company was made up of a syndicate of 35 purchasing groups representing a total of 58 individual investors.  The leader of this group and the head of the Connecticut Land Company was Oliver Phelps. He was the single largest investor in the company and the head manager of this investment project.  Another key figure in the company was Moses Cleaveland, one of the company’s first directors.  He was in charge of conducting the first company survey of the Western Connecticut Reserves in 1796.  Moses Cleaveland successfully negotiated a treaty with the Iroquois, who gave up all of their land claims east of the Cuyahoga River.   He also founded a settlement named after him that would later become the city “Cleveland” due to a cartographic error.

Company Background

In 1795, the Connecticut Land Company paid the state of Connecticut $1.2 million for three million acres of its Western Reserve lands.  The $1.2 million raised by the state was used to fund public education.  This allowed Connecticut to expand its public school system and improve its educational facilities.  With regards to the land purchased by the company, it was divided into 1.2 million shares.  On September 5, 1795, the company adopted articles of association, and each purchasing group was given a proportional share of the land commensurate with the amount of capital invested.

The main purpose of the Connecticut Land Company was the pursuit of profits through the sale of the lands to both land speculators and settlers. Land would usually be sold many times between speculators and investors before it would be sold to someone who would actually settle it.     Due to weak land sales, the company was forced to lower prices and give away free land in order to encourage settlement.  The problems that forced the company to lower prices would ultimately force the company into bankruptcy.

Company’s Problems

One of the problems that befell the Connecticut Land Company was company mismanagement.  Sales efforts by the company were not centrally organized.  The company did not even set up a marketing office in the Western Reserve to promote sales of land.   Without an organized, concerted sales campaign by the company, their efforts to sell the land were mostly unsuccessful.  In fact, only 1000 people had settled in the region by 1800.

The other problem that beset the company and hurt land sales was political uncertainty surrounding the Connecticut Western Reserves.  The political confusion concerned the right to govern the land and the legitimacy of the land titles.  There were disputes between the Northwest Territory and the state of Connecticut over who had the right to govern the land purchased by the company.  In addition, the company wanted Connecticut to guarantee the land titles that the company issues, but Connecticut refused.  As a result of this uncertain surrounding the legality of land titles and jurisdiction, many would-be settlers decided not to come.   Making settlement even less attractive was the fact that the US government did not recognize the Western Reserve as part of the Northwest Territory until 1800.  In practice this means that the US government did not provide settlers with legal or military protection.   Then, on April 28, 1800, the Quieting Act was signed by President Adams into law.  The Quieting Act established Connecticut’s right to govern the land and guaranteed the legality of the land titles granted by the Connecticut Land Company.    This was meant to encourage and speed up settlement and development of the region.  Although this act resolved the problem of political uncertainty, continued poor company management meant that few settlers came.  More significant development of the region would have to wait until after the War of 1812.

Company Bankruptcy

As a result of weak land sales stemming from company mismanagement and political uncertainty, the Connecticut Land Company failed to reach profitability.   In 1809, a mere fourteen years after incorporation, the company faced bankruptcy and was dissolved.  All of the remaining land was divided evenly among the investors of the company.  At that time, the company still owed a large amount of debt and was delinquent in its interest payments.

References

 
Early American land companies
History of Connecticut
Pre-statehood history of Ohio
History of Ohio
1795 establishments in Connecticut
American companies established in 1795